The 2006 Orange Prokom Open was the ninth edition of this men's tennis tournament and was played on outdoor clay courts. The tournament was part of the International Series of the 2006 ATP Tour. It took place in Sopot, Poland from July 31 through August 6, 2006.

Finals

Men's singles

 Nikolay Davydenko defeated  Florian Mayer, 7–6(8–6), 5–7, 6–4
 It was Davydenko's 2nd title of the year and the 7th of his career.

Men's doubles

 František Čermák /  Leoš Friedl defeated  Martín García /  Sebastián Prieto, 6–3, 7–5
 It was Čermák's 3rd title of the year and the 13th of his career. It was Friedl's 3rd title of the year and the 14th of his career.

References

Orange Prokom Open
Orange